Conrad Stargard is the protagonist and title character in a series of time travel novels written by the Polish American writer Leo Frankowski.  In them,  a Polish engineer named Conrad Schwartz is sent back in time to the 13th century where he has to establish himself and cope with various crises including the eventual Mongol invasion of Poland in 1240.

The character of Conrad has at times been described as a Mary Sue, and some aspects of the novels can be looked at as authorial wish-fulfillment. In response to this criticism in an early draft of the first book, Frankowski modified the character to have the opposite traits as himself, such as Conrad's socialism and devout Catholicism.

The books 
The series originally consisted of four books, with a fifth released shortly after to wrap up loose ends:

 The Cross-Time Engineer
 The High-Tech Knight
 The Radiant Warrior
 The Flying Warlord
 Lord Conrad's Lady

All of the original books were originally published by Del Rey Books, and released by Baen Books in later runs. In late 2005, Frankowski self-published Lord Conrad's Crusade after a dispute with Baen. The final book in the series, Conrad's Last Campaign, was published in 2014—eight years after the author's death.

Frankowski also wrote two books set in the same universe as the original series but not featuring the main character Conrad:

 Conrad's Quest for Rubber: A story about group of soldiers known as the "Explorer Corps" and their mission to the Americas. 
 Conrad's Time Machine: A novel about Conrad's cousin's, and his associates, invention of the time machine that stranded Conrad the 13th century.

The Conrad Stargard books belong to the subgenre started by Mark Twain's classic A Connecticut Yankee in King Arthur's Court, in which a modern person goes back in time and anachronistically introduces various modern technical innovations and social institutions centuries sooner than happened in our history.

The Stargard books differ significantly from Twain's concept in having a diametrically opposite role for the Catholic Church. The staunchly freethinking Twain assigned to the Medieval Church the role of strongly opposing his protagonist's innovations and doing all in its power to undo them; on the contrary Frankowski—of a Polish Catholic background—provided his own time traveler from the very moment of arrival in the past with a friendly and sympathetic clergyman, who steadily rises in the Church hierarchy and ensures that the Church adopts a benevolently neutral attitude to Conrad's various enterprises, considerably helping their success.

General plot overview 

Unlike Twain's Yankee—who ultimately failed and saw all his efforts come to nought—Conrad Stargard is eminently successful in creating a new timeline in which a technologically advanced Poland becomes the dominant power in thirteenth-century Europe and Stargard himself is the most powerful man in Poland (though he chooses not to dethrone the King).

One crucial difference is that in the depiction of the staunchly atheist Twain, the Catholic Church is dead-set against the interloper from the future and all his works, and it is the clergy which ultimately plays a major role in his downfall. Conversely, immediately upon his arrival in the past, Conrad Stargard meets and befriends a sympathetic Franciscan—who later on rises fast in the Church hierarchy, parallel to Stargard's own climb to eminence, and who ensures that the Church would welcome the time-traveler's New Order (and gain some considerable advantages to itself in the process). However, their official inquisition regarding Conrad (to decide if he is an agent of God or an agent of the Devil) never gets anywhere, due to the Church's excruciatingly slow bureaucracy.

The Cross-Time Engineer
The main character Conrad Stargard is a Polish engineer from the year 1986. After getting drunk and falling asleep in a time machine, he is transported back in time to the year 1231. Conrad, familiar with Poland's history, knows that in 10 years the Mongols will arrive and kill most of the population of Europe. After befriending a local monk, and a failed attempt at becoming a scribe,  he takes a job as a bodyguard to a merchant. Due to his skill at arms and mercy in saving the infant of bandits he had slain, he impresses the local count, Count Lambert. It is discovered at this point that Conrad's "amazing warhorse" and "superb weapons" were all planted by his distant cousin who invented the time-machines and wished to help Conrad. However, due to causality, Conrad cannot be simply removed from the past, but he can be "assisted". After improving Count Lambert's industrial base by building a cloth factory and multipurpose windmill, Conrad is eventually granted land on which he can build his industrial base to defend Poland.

The High-Tech Knight
This book details the travails that occur as Conrad attempts to establish the industrial base that he will need for his planned defense of Poland. He also establishes the thirteenth century equivalent to the Playboy Club, builds a new city, gains several new lovers and elevates his status in the ruling hierarchy of the country.

The Radiant Warrior 
The third book deals with Conrad's establishment of an official Polish army using 20th century training techniques he learned during his service as an officer in the Polish Air Force. By the end of the book, he has been elevated from knight to baron.

The Flying Warlord 
This book covers the four years prior to Mongol invasion. Conrad begins a relationship with Countess Francine, the French-born paramour of the murdered Duke Henryk. He establishes a riverboat navy and an air force. Lambert tries to force Conrad to marry his daughter, threatening to strip him of his lands and title if he refuses. Disgusted, Conrad decides to leave Poland and travel alone to France. He stops to visit Francine, who convinces him to marry her and resume his position. After the wedding, a council of war is called by young Duke Henryk (son of the murdered duke). Count Conrad disagrees with the duke's battle plans, as they would require him to abandon his own lands and withdraw west to Legnica, where his infantry could not maneuver effectively without the steamboats and railroads he built. Other lords of Poland's eastern lands are likewise opposed the duke's idea, but to disobey would be high treason. Conrad ends up fighting the war by himself. After returning to the Warriors' School to finish preparations for the war, he enlists the aid of Count Lambert, the commander of Eagle Nest where they have created scout aircraft, in his treason. Lambert readily agrees, believing Conrad to be answering to a higher authority. The war starts with the battle of the Vistula and finishes with the slaughter of the Mongols at the battle of Sandomierz, apparently ending the war and also ending the book.

Lord Conrad's Lady 
The fifth book serves to tie up loose ends from The Flying Warlord. Conrad has successfully defeated the Mongols, but must now piece together the various parts of Poland.  Although he keeps refining his technological advances, the majority of his time is spent establishing Poland as the primary social, economic, technological and military country of the region (and soon to be the world).  Political intrigue abounds as various factions (including his wife) try to chart the best course for Poland.

Conrad's Quest For Rubber 
This book is from the point of view of a new character Josip Sobieski. Josip is a young man enrolled with Conrad's "Explorer Corps" whose purpose is to explore new lands in order to find new materials for Conrad's modernization of Europe (mainly rubber). This book primarily revolves around Josip's explorations in both the Arctic Circle and the Amazon River.

Conrad's Time Machine 
Prequel to the series loosely gives the story of how the time machine was invented and used.

Lord Conrad's Crusade 
Conrad goes on vacation, ends up shipwrecked in north Africa and enslaved.  He discovers his uncle did more of a tune-up than believed when he got his "physical" and his Christian Army uses his disappearance as an excuse to invade Africa and eventually the Holy Lands and find him.

Conrad's Last Campaign 
The Mongols are overdue, so Conrad takes the war to them.

References

Alternate history characters
Literary characters introduced in 1988
Characters in American novels of the 20th century
Characters in American novels of the 21st century